The Regional Force Surveillance Group (RFSG) was formally established on 4 October 2018 to command the Australian Army Reserve's three Regional Force Surveillance Units and a training unit. The RFSG forms part of the 2nd Division.

The RFSG is tasked "to provide a littoral surveillance and reconnaissance capability in Australia's north and northwest in order to support whole-of-government efforts to maintain national sovereignty and border security". The three Regional Force Surveillance Units conduct operational patrols as part of Operation Resolute.

Upon formation, the Regional Force Surveillance Group comprised:
 Group Headquarters located at Larrakeyah Barracks in Darwin
 NORFORCE (responsible for the Northern Territory and Kimberley region of Western Australia)
 The Pilbara Regiment (responsible for the Pilbara region of Western Australia)
 51st Battalion, Far North Queensland Regiment (responsible for North Queensland)
 Indigenous Development Wing

The Group headquarters provides a single formation headquarters to formalise command and control arrangements and knowledge sharing between the three units.

The Indigenous Development Wing is responsible for delivering key training programs to Indigenous Australian soldiers across the Army and running the Regional Force Surveillance Group Education and Development Course. It was also established on 4 October 2018.

References

Military units and formations established in 2018
Indigenous Australians in the military
2018 establishments in Australia
Military units and formations of the Australian Army
Army reconnaissance units and formations
Group sized units of armies (land forces)